Yuan Yao (Yüan Yao, traditional: 袁耀, simplified: 袁耀); was a Chinese landscape painter during the Qing Dynasty (1644–1912). Yuan was born in Yangzhou in the Jiangsu province. His courtesy name was Zhaodao, and he took the art name Niyuzhe. His specific years of birth and death are not known.

Yuan primarily painted landscapes and was a student of Yuan Jiang. Yuan was, along with Yuan Jiang, Li Yin, Yan Yi, and Wang Yun, a notable practitioner of “boundary painting" (jiehua) techniques, associated with realist gongbi practices. These painters were all based in Yangzhou.

References

Qing dynasty landscape painters
Year of death unknown
Painters from Yangzhou
Year of birth unknown